Melløs is a borough of the city Moss in Norway. It is located in the south of the city, bordering Kallum in Rygge municipality to the south. The name Melløs is known in Norway via Melløs Stadion, the home ground of Moss FK.

Villages in Østfold